Sunnynook busway station is the smallest station on the Northern Busway in Auckland, New Zealand. It is located in the suburb of Sunnynook. Many passengers walk to the station, one of the busiest on the busway, as it does not have park and ride facilities like the other busway stations.

It has shelters, electronic real-time information and passenger drop off and pick up, but does not have ramps allowing feeder buses to enter the station.

The next station southbound is Smales Farm busway station. The next northbound is Constellation busway station.

History 
Construction began in 2005 as part of the Northern Busway project with the station intended to serve a large residential area. The station opened in February 2008.

In 2012, Auckland Transport collaborated with Auckland Council's Stormwater and Parks to improve access to the station. The main objective of the project was to create a new walkway and bridge to provide direct access from Kapiti Place. For pedestrians and cyclists, this shortened the route by up to 850 metres. The improvements also included new toilet and cycle facilities, landscaping, lighting and CCTV, and signage. Additionally, a 45 metre glass noise wall was installed across the bridge to dampen noise from station.

Services
As of 20 February 2020, the following bus routes serve Sunnynook station: NX1, NX2, 866, 83, and, via the nearby Sunnynook Road stops, 907.

References

External links 

 Auckland Transport The Auckland Council Controlled Organisation that owns the station and oversees the operation of AT Metro bus services

Northern Busway, Auckland
Bus stations in New Zealand
Transport buildings and structures in the Auckland Region